Christine Mailliet (born January 9, 1987) is a Luxembourgian swimmer, who specialized in sprint freestyle and butterfly events. She is a multiple-time Luxembourgish record holder in both long and short course freestyle (200 and 400 m) and butterfly (50, 100, and 200 m).

Mailliet competed as a lone female swimmer for Luxembourg in the 200 m freestyle at the 2008 Summer Olympics in Beijing. Leading up to the Games, she smashed a Luxembourgish record in 2:02.71 to clear the FINA B-cut (2:03.50) by nearly a second at the Open Luxembourg Nationals in Luxembourg City. Swimming on the outside in heat two, Mailliet raced her way to sixth place with a steady 2:02.91, just two tenths of a second (0.2) shy off her entry time. Mailliet failed to advance to the semifinals, as she placed thirty-ninth overall in the prelims.

References

External links
NBC Olympics Profile

1987 births
Living people
Luxembourgian female swimmers
Olympic swimmers of Luxembourg
Swimmers at the 2008 Summer Olympics
Luxembourgian female freestyle swimmers
Sportspeople from Luxembourg City